Southwestern Railroad could refer to:
Southwestern Railroad (Georgia), predecessor of the Central of Georgia Railway
Southwestern Railroad (Kentucky), predecessor of the Southern Railway (1876-1889)
Southwestern Railroad (New Mexico), presently operating
Southwestern Railroad (Tennessee), predecessor of the Nashville, Chattanooga and St. Louis Railway (1852-1877)